Lindapterys vokesae is a species of sea snail, a marine gastropod mollusk in the family Muricidae, the murex snails or rock snails.

Description
Original description: "General morphology as for genus; 6 axial ribs between varices; 5 tiny labial denticles; outer edge of lip flaring but narrow."

Distribution
Locus typicus: "Locality TU951(Tulane University Locality), Ten Mile Creek, 
Calhoun County, Florida, Chipola Formation, early Miocene of North Florida."

References

Gastropods described in 1987
Lindapterys